The 2015–16 Croatian Women's First Football League (Prva hrvatska nogometna liga za žene) was the twenty fifth season of Croatian Women's First Football League, the national championship for women's association football teams in Croatia, since its establishment in 1992.

The league was contested by 10 teams. ŽNK Osijek were the defending champions, having won their nineteenth title in 2014–15.

Teams

The following is a complete list of teams who are contesting the 2015–16 Croatian Women's First Football League.

League table

Results

Top scorers
Updated to matches played on 22 May 2016.

References

External links
Croatian Women's First Football League at UEFA.com
Croatian Women's First Football League at Croatian Football Federation website
Croatian Women's First Football League at soccerway.com

Croatian Women's First Football League seasons
Croatia
women
Football
Football